The Ministry of Awqaf of Egypt is one of ministries in the Egyptian government and is in charge of religious endowments. Religious endowments, awqaf, are similar to common law trusts where the trustee is the mosque or individual in charge of the waqf and the beneficiary is usually the community as a whole. Examples of waqfs are of a plot of land, a market, a hospital, or any other building that would aid the community.

History

Before Moez Masoud 
Before the nationalization of the awqaf, the mosques helped in lending the poorer citizens a voice. For example, Al-Azhar mosque would aid the community through the endowments and remained economically separate via the revenue they earned from the awqaf. This enabled the mosque to maintain a state of independence from the dictates of the government and rulers. Mosques could use the endowments to help the community as needed. Also, because mosques were economically independent, imams could preach what they felt was important, with little to no government intervention. However, when the government effectively took over the endowments program, the people suffered greatly. They no longer had their only means of political representation and Al-Azhar’s religious influence was manipulated into producing propaganda by the state.

Nationalization of awqaf

The first Egyptian leader to nationalize the awqaf was Muhammad Ali. He began the precedent of bringing the endowments under state control. His successors continued the process and by the time King Fuad I was in power, Al-Azhar carried out the government’s wishes. When the king desired to be caliph some “…Al-Azhar sheikhs were ready to provide the necessary pronouncements” (Ibrahim 636). Endowments were considered a part of the state when Gamal Abdel Nasser nationalized them in 1952. Gamal Abdel Nasser used the newly created propaganda machine of Al-Azhar to “…justify Arab Socialism and his struggle against Israel” (Ibrahim 636). Anwar Sadat continued Nasser’s policies of using Al-Azhar for the “…sake of justifying opposing policies, including his treaty with Israel” (Ibrahim 637).

This process arguably twisted what was once a community-benefitting mosque, into a corrupt political machine; and with the Ministry of Awqaf promoting rationalism rather than supporting the cause of the poor. In 1977 Jamaat al Muslimin, a guerrilla Islamic group that rose out of the Muslim Brotherhood, killed the former Minister of Awqaf, Muhammad al-Dhahabi, after the arrest of its members.  The Ministry of Awqaf and the mosques, was in the eyes of much of the public a tool of the state, and because the mosques were now under the state’s economic control, the imams were effectively employees of the state. The government, for the first time, now had the authority to dictate to the imams and the mosque what could or could not be preached.

Dar al-Kiswa 

In 1953 the ministry took control of the Dar al-Kiswa al-Sharifa ("house of the noble kiswa"), an artistic workshop on the al-Khoronfesh street in Cairo. Founded in 1817, the Dar al-Kiswa was responsible for producing textiles for the holy sites of Mecca and Medina. It was named after the kiswa, the embroidered covering for the Kaaba which is replaced annually. From 1962 onwards the textiles were made in Mecca. The staff of the Cairo workshop declined to a small number, and the workshop officially closed in 1997. The building is now used by the ministry as a storage space.

Present day
The deposed President Hosni Mubarak followed the precedent of his predecessors in keeping the establishment of awqaf nationalized. The government today aims to moderate the tone of the mosques and retains the ability to do so by means of the ministry. Mahmoud Hamdy Zakzouk served as minister from 1995 to 2011. The ministry also serves as an archives center for various awqaf legal documents over the past hundreds of years.

Crime at awqaf mosques

In the year 2008 growing concern erupted in Egypt over the increase of thefts from Awqaf mosques in Egypt, such as Ganim Al Bahlawan and Altinbugha Al-Maridani mosques, where inlaid wood panels from the minbars were stolen. Thieves were also caught trying to steal an ironwork grill window from the sabil kuttab of Rokaya Dudu. The Supreme Council of Antiquities (SCA) blamed the Ministry of Awqaf for the incidents, stating that the role of the SCA is only to restore mosques and give then back to the Awqaf, who are then in charge of security. Yet, legally the SCA is in charge of security of monuments and archaeological sites. In 2017, it was decided that some mosque artifacts would be stored at SCA warehouses, for security reasons.

Ministers
Muhammad Metwalli al-Sha'rawi (1976-1978)
Mahmoud Zakzouk (1995-2011)
Mohamed Mokhtar Gomaa (2013–present)

See also

Cabinet of Egypt
Religion in Egypt
 Comité de Conservation des Monuments de l'Art Arabe

References

Ibrahim, Saad E. "Egypt's Islamic activism in the 1980s." Third World Quarterly (1988).

External links
Official website 
 Egypt's Cabinet Database

Government ministries of Egypt
Religion in Egypt
Islam in Egypt
Egypt